Great Nicobar Development Plan, spread over 166 sqkm of the 910 sqkm island, is an under-construction mega infrastructure project for the southern tip of Great Nicobar Island in Andaman Sea of India. Total project costing Rs. ₹75,000 crore (US$9.4 b in 2022), conceived by NITI Aayog & being developed by Andaman and Nicobar Islands Integrated Development Corporation (ANIIDC), with geostrategic importance for defence, logistics, commerce and industries, eco-tourism, coastal tourism, Coastal Regulation Zone, etc, has four components: 
 Galathea Bay International Container Transhipment Terminal (Galathea Bay ICTT), with 14.2 million TEUs (unit of cargo) capacity eventually.
 Great Nicobar International Airport (GNIA): greenfield airport with peak hour capacity of 4,000 passengers.
 Great Nicobar Gas and Solar Power Plant (Great Nicobar GSPP): with 450-MVA capacity, spread over 16,610 hectares.
 Costal cities: two new greenfield coastal cities.

Indian Ministry of Environment, Forest and Climate Change’s Expert Appraisal Committee had already granted the environmental clearance in 2022 after considering the environmental risks and mitigation strategies.

History

Feasibility report, commissioned by NITI Aayog, was prepared by AECOM India. On 25th May 2021, terms of reference of  project was granted after meeeting held by Expert Appraisal Committee.

Existing Infrastructure
INS Baaz is a naval base located at Campbell Bay. It comes Andaman and Nicobar Command. It connects island with Car Nicobar and Port Blair Air bases.

Concerns: Environmental impact & mitigation 

After weighing the following pros and cons, benefits, risk and mitigation strategies, the project was granted the environmental clearance by the MoEFCC’s Expert Appraisal Committee.

Corals: To mitigate the risk of loss of corals, the corals will be translocated in the reefs around the island.

Fauna: The project area within 10 km radius of Galthea Bay is ecologically sensitive zone and home of rare fauna such as Leatherback Sea Turtle, salt water crocodile, Nicobar macaque.  To mitigate the risk, the Indian MoEFCC’s Expert Appraisal Committee has proposed three conservation sites for fauna - Little Nicobar, Menchal Island and Meroe Island.

People: This project will increase population to over 3.5 lakh (350,000), which may cause a threat to the indigenous communities. After the environmental clearance by MoEFCC, some experts and researchers expressed concerns to MoTA about indigenous communities on the island. Around 1761 inhabitants, including indigenous Shompen people and Nicobarese communities of this island, are likely to be affected by this project. 853 square kilometres of this island is designated as tribal reserve under the Andaman and Nicobar Protection of Aboriginal Tribes Regulation, 1956. This means that the land is meant for exclusive use of the community and others cannot access the area without their express permission. Around 10% of tribal reserve of the island will be affected by this project. Indigenous people live outside the project area and the tribal reserve also falls outside the project area. According to Forest Rights Act, 2006, Shompen people are legal sole authority to preserve the forest reserve.

Present status

 28 Jan 2023 - bids opened: Bids submitted by vendors for the ₹41,000-crore (US$8 b) mega international container transhipment port (ICTP) at Galathea Bay were opened today, phase-1 with 4 million twenty foot equivalent units (TEUs) will be completed by 2028, and capacity will be eventually increased to 16 TEU.Bids for Andaman's Rs 41,000-crore mega port project open today., Economic Times, 28 Jan 2023.
 Ten Companies has filled Expression of Interest,
 Adani Ports & SEZ
 Container Corporation of India
 Essar Ports
 JSW Infrastructure
 Megha Engineering & Infrastructures
 Navayuga Engineering
 PDP International
 Rail Vikas Nigam
 Royal Boskalis Westminster N. V.
 Syama Prasad Mookerjee Port
 Vishwa Samudra Holdings

See also 

 Strategic importance of Andaman and Nicobar
 Sea lines of communication
 Andaman Sea
 Andaman and Nicobar Islands

References 

Nicobar Islands
Tourism in the Andaman and Nicobar Islands
Ports and harbours of the Andaman and Nicobar Islands